Franz Brendel is a retired slalom canoeist who competed for East Germany in the mid-to-late 1950s. He won two medals in the C-2 team event at the ICF Canoe Slalom World Championships with a silver in 1955 and a bronze in 1957.

References

German male canoeists
Possibly living people
Year of birth missing
Medalists at the ICF Canoe Slalom World Championships